Asura ruptifascia is a moth of the family Erebidae. It is found in India and Sri Lanka.

Description
The species' wingspan is about 18 mm. Antennae of male ciliated. Body pure ochreous. Sub-basal band of forewings outwardly oblique towards inner margin and anastomosing (fusing) with the medial band. Upper portion of the postmedial band reduced to a speck series. Hindwings with a well defined fuscous band.

References

ruptifascia
Moths described in 1893
Moths of Asia
Moths of Sri Lanka